Ichhawar Assembly constituency is one of the 230 Vidhan Sabha (Legislative Assembly) constituencies of Madhya Pradesh state in central India.

It is part of Sehore District.

Members of Legislative Assembly

Election Results

2013 results

See also
 Ichhawar

References

Vidisha district
Assembly constituencies of Madhya Pradesh